Meteorological Applications is a peer-reviewed scientific journal of meteorology published four times per year since 1994. It is published by John Wiley & Sons on behalf of the Royal Meteorological Society.

Abstracting and indexing 
The journal is abstracted and indexed in Current Contents (under Physical, Chemical & Earth Sciences) and in the Science Citation Index, among other places. According to the Journal Citation Reports, the journal has a 2020 impact factor of 2.119, ranking it 64th out of 94 journals in the category "Meteorology & Atmospheric Sciences".

References

External links 
 

Wiley-Blackwell academic journals
Publications established in 1994
Royal Meteorological Society academic journals
English-language journals
Quarterly journals
Meteorology journals